Cocopandan syrup is a common product in Southeast Asian cuisines. It is made from coconut syrup and pandan juice. Cocopandan syrup is, without colors added, clear/colorless or white. In Indonesia, the cocopandan syrup is in red colour, because it mixed with roselle.

See also
Es kelapa muda
Es teler

References

Southeast Asian cuisine